Söderqvist is a surname. Notable people with the surname include:

Jan Söderqvist, author, see Netocracy
Louise Söderqvist, Swedish journalist and publicist
Nils-Erik Söderqvist (born 1948), Swedish politician
Robin Söderqvist (born 1994), Swedish ice hockey player